Officially Dzitoghtsyan House-Museum of Social Life and National Architecture, is a museum in the Kumayri historic district of Gyumri, Armenia. It was founded in 1984 in the Dzitoghtsyan family house, dating back to the 19th century. The museum exhibits elements of the daily urban life of Gyumri, as well as the local cultural and architectural characteristics of the city.

The famous house of Dzitoghtsyan family was built in 1872 by four brothers who migrated from the Western Armenian village of Dzitogh, to the city of Alexandropol. It is built with the famous red tuff stone of Shirak.

The house-museum, exhibits a collection of the Alexandropol social life characteristics, from the 19th century up to the 1920s. It also features the cultural, architectural and religious aspects of the city.

References

Museums established in 1984
History museums in Armenia
Buildings and structures in Gyumri
Buildings and structures completed in 1872